Oculina diffusa, commonly known as the diffuse ivory bush coral or ivory tree coral, is found in the eastern Atlantic Ocean, the Gulf of Mexico, and the Caribbean Sea. Its colonies are dense and have a yellow-brown color. It favours areas with high amounts of sedimentation.

Physical appearance
Colonies have been recorded at temperatures ranging from 13–31 degrees Celsius.

Food
Oculina diffusa normally eat plankton and small fish, though some have also been known to filter feed on tiny particles in the water.

Reproduction
Oculina diffusa reproduces sexually by broadcast spawning. In shallow water, this is believed to occur between July and August, and during September in deeper water. After being planktonic, the larva sinks to the bottom where it grows into a polyp. This produces buds asexually and develops into a colony.

References

http://www.sms.si.edu/irlSpec/Oculin_diffus.htm
http://www.advancedaquarist.com/2008/5/aafeature1_album/27.jpg

Oculinidae
Taxa named by Jean-Baptiste Lamarck
Corals described in 1816